Áed Rón mac Cathail (died 604) was a king of the Uí Failge, a Laigin people of County Offaly. He was the grandson of Bruidge mac Nath Í (died 579), a previous king.

He is listed as king in the Book of Leinster king list though incorrectly as Aed Róin mac Falge Ruit. He is also mentioned in a poem in the genealogies about the royal fort at Rathangan, County Kildare. His father Cathal mac Bruidgi was also mentioned as king in this poem but is not in the king list or annals.

Áed took the side of the Síl nÁedo Sláine branch versus the Clann Cholmáin in the feud among the southern Ui Neill. As a result he was slain in 604 on the same day as Áed Sláine in the interests of Conall Guthbinn (died 635), king of Uisnech.

His son Ailill mac Áedo Róin was a king of the Uí Failge. However future kings were to descend from his brother Máel Uma.

Notes

See also
 Kings of Ui Failghe

References

 Byrne, Francis John (2001), Irish Kings and High-Kings, Dublin: Four Courts Press, 
 Mac Niocaill, Gearoid (1972), Ireland before the Vikings, Dublin: Gill and Macmillan
 Ó Cróinín, Dáibhí (2005), A New History of Ireland, Volume One, Oxford: Oxford University Press

External links
CELT: Corpus of Electronic Texts at University College Cork

604 deaths
People from County Offaly
6th-century Irish monarchs
7th-century Irish monarchs
Year of birth unknown